= Henry Ford Health System 200 =

Henry Ford Health System 200 may refer to:

- NASCAR Craftsman Truck Series at Michigan International Speedway, at Michigan International Speedway.
- Henry Ford Health System 200 (ARCA), at the same track.
